Spatz is a children's comedy series that ran on Children's ITV during the 1990s, produced by Thames Television and created by Andrew Bethell. The show originally ran from 21 February 1990 to 10 April 1992. The show centred on a fast food restaurant situated in a fictional shopping mall in Cricklewood, London. It was operated by two Canadians, Karen Hansson (Jennifer Calvert), Spatz International's self-centered European Co-ordinator, and Thomas "TJ" Strickland (Paul Michael), the restaurant's kind-hearted manager. Vas Blackwood, Stephanie Charles, Jonathan Copestake, Sue Devaney, Joe Greco, Katy Murphy, Ling Tai and Samantha Womack appeared as Spatz restaurant employees. Guest stars included David Harewood, Rhys Ifans, Gary Lineker, Danny John-Jules and Nicholas Parsons.

History
Spatz was devised by Andrew Bethell as a drama for teenagers set in a 1930s themed burger bar, so named because spats might have been worn there. Alan Horrox at Thames Television bought the concept and title and passed them to Grant Cathro and Lee Pressman, already established at Thames Television as the writers of T-Bag and creators of Mike and Angelo, to develop Spatz as a sitcom. While updating the setting to a standard fast food restaurant, the name Spatz was retained, with the writers noting that it suggested spats or disagreements.

Series 1 of Spatz was a co-production between Thames Television and Canada's YTV. From Series 2 onwards, Spatz was produced solely by Thames Television.

Old Skool Weekend
On 6 January 2013, an episode of Spatz from 1992 ("Tango", the third episode of Series 3) was repeated on CITV as part of its 30th anniversary.

Transmissions

References

External links

Glad You Remember - Spatz

1990 British television series debuts
1992 British television series endings
1990s British children's television series
ITV children's television shows
1990s British teen sitcoms
Fictional restaurants
Television series by FremantleMedia Kids & Family
Television shows set in London
English-language television shows
Television shows produced by Thames Television
Television series set in restaurants